Antonio Bareiro Álvarez (born April 24, 1989) is a Paraguayan professional footballer who plays as a midfielder and forward for Paraguayan side Club Libertad.

Playing career
Bareiro was promoted to the Club General Díaz first team in the fall of 2009. He was transferred to Sportivo Trinidense in early 2010, but returned to General Díaz 12 months later. He was quickly loaned out to Club Rubio Ñu, where he immediately earned a spot in the starting lineup. He returned to General Díaz in 2013, scoring the game-winning goal in the 77th minute in his first game back, a league match against Deportivo Capiatá in February. He finished the 2013 Clausura season as the 9th leading goalscorer, with 6.

Bareiro was signed to Club Libertad on a four-year contract in January 2014. He made his team debut on February 14 against Club Guaraní as a part of the starting XI. Libertad won both the Apertura and Clausura tournaments in 2014.

International goals
Scores and results list Paraguay's goal tally first.

Honors

Club
Club Libertad
Paraguayan Primera División (3): 2014 Apertura, 2014 Clausura, 2016 Apertura

Club General Díaz
Paraguayan División Intermedia (1): 2012

References

External links
 
 

1989 births
Living people
Paraguayan footballers
Paraguay international footballers
General Díaz footballers
Sportivo Trinidense footballers
Club Rubio Ñu footballers
Club Libertad footballers
Paraguayan Primera División players
Association football midfielders
Association football forwards
People from Caazapá